Tiger Shark is a 1932 American pre-Code melodrama romantic film directed by Howard Hawks and starring Edward G. Robinson, Richard Arlen and Zita Johann.

Plot
The wife of one-handed tuna fisherman Mike Mascarenhas falls for the man whose life Mike had saved while at sea.

Cast

Production notes
The film was made in the same year as Scarface, which is considered to be the Howard Hawks' best film of the early sound era. The general storyline was repeated several times in later films such as Manpower (1941) with Marlene Dietrich and George Raft, in which Robinson plays the same role but as a powerline worker.

The film's leading lady Zita Johann may be best remembered for her role in Karl Freund's The Mummy (1932).

Box office
According to Warner Bros. records, the film earned $436,000 domestically and $443,000 foreign.

References

External links
 
 
 
 

1932 films
1932 romantic drama films
American black-and-white films
American romantic drama films
1930s English-language films
Films about fishing
Films about sharks
Films directed by Howard Hawks
Films set in Hawaii
Films shot in San Diego
Films shot in Hawaii
First National Pictures films
Melodrama films
1930s American films
Films scored by Bernhard Kaun